The State Line Marker is a historic boundary marker on the state line between Arkansas and Oklahoma. The marker was originally an octagonal cast iron pipe, with the legend "48 M" on the north face (signifying its marking of the 48th mile), "1877" on the south side (the year of the marker's erection), "ARK" (for Arkansas) on the east side, and "CHOC" (for Choctaw Territory) on the west side. The pipe was mounted in a stone and mortar base installed by the United States Forest Service in 1974. The marker was placed in 1877 following a series of controversial surveys to demarcate the border between Arkansas and what was then Indian Territory.

The marker was listed on the National Register of Historic Places in 1976.  This marker was one of the few surviving markers from this survey that is accessible to the public.

See also
National Register of Historic Places listings in Polk County, Arkansas
National Register of Historic Places listings in Le Flore County, Oklahoma

References

Monuments and memorials on the National Register of Historic Places in Arkansas
Monuments and memorials on the National Register of Historic Places in Oklahoma
Buildings and structures completed in 1877
Polk County, Arkansas
LeFlore County, Oklahoma
1870s in Indian Territory
Boundary markers
National Register of Historic Places in Polk County, Arkansas
National Register of Historic Places in Le Flore County, Oklahoma
1877 establishments in Indian Territory
1877 establishments in Arkansas